Babina is a constituency of the Uttar Pradesh Legislative Assembly covering the city of Babina in the Jhansi district of Uttar Pradesh, India. Babina is one of five assembly constituencies in the Jhansi Lok Sabha constituency. Since 2008, this assembly constituency is numbered 222 amongst 403 constituencies.

Currently this seat belongs to Bharatiya Janta Party candidate Rajeev Singh Parichha who won in last Assembly election of 2022 Uttar Pradesh Legislative Elections defeating Samajwadi Party candidate Yashpal Singh Yadav by a margin of 44,529 votes.

Members of Legislative Assembly 
 Bhagwat Dayal (1974-1977) from Bharatiya Jana Sangh
 Bhagwat Dayal (1977-1980) from Janata Party
Beni Bai (1980-1985) from Indian National Congress - I
Beni Bal (1985-1989) from Indian National Congress
Ratan Lal Ahirwar (1989-1991) from Bharatiya Janata Party
Ratan Lal Ahirwar (1991-1993) from Bharatiya Janata Party
Ratan Lal Ahirwar (1993-1996) from Bharatiya Janata Party
Shatish Jatariya (1996-2002) from Bahujan Samaj Party
Ratan Lal Ahirwar (2002-2007) from Samajwadi Party
Ratan Lal Ahirwar (2007-2012) from Bahujan Samaj Party
Krishna Pal Singh Rajpoot (2012-2017) from Bahujan Samaj Party
Rajeev Singh Parichha (2017-2022) from Bharatiya Janata Party
Rajeev Singh Parichha (2022-Incumbent) from Bharatiya Janata Party

References

External links
 

Assembly constituencies of Uttar Pradesh
Jhansi district